The Valley of Love (German: 	Das Tal der Liebe or Der Ammenkönig) is a 1935 German comedy film directed by Hans Steinhoff and starring Käthe Gold, Richard Romanowsky and Marieluise Claudius.  It was shot at the Johannisthal Studios of Tobis Film in Berlin. The film's sets were designed by the art director Franz Schroedter. It is based on the 1902 farce Das Tal des Lebens by Max Dreyer. It was given a fresh release in 1950 by Deutsche London Film.

Cast
 Käthe Gold as 	Die Marktgräfin
 Richard Romanowsky as Der Marktgraf
 Gustav Knuth as 	Hans Stork
 Marieluise Claudius as 	Lisbeth
 Erika von Thellmann as 	Prinzessin Mathilde, die Schwester des Marktgrafen
 Fita Benkhoff as Theres
 Theo Lingen as 	Der Keuschheitskommissar
 Georg H. Schnell as Herr von Geldern
 Erhard Siedel as 	Flitzinger
 Rudolf Klein-Rogge as 	Herr von Roden
 Ernst Behmer as 	Leibdiener Pfeffermann
 Gerhard Dammann as 	Wachtmeister Schlippenbach
 Flockina von Platen as 	Frau von Prillwitz, Hofdame
 Friedrich Ettel as Sass

References

Bibliography 
 Bock, Hans-Michael & Bergfelder, Tim. The Concise Cinegraph: Encyclopaedia of German Cinema. Berghahn Books, 2009.
 Giesen, Rolf. The Nosferatu Story: The Seminal Horror Film, Its Predecessors and Its Enduring Legacy. McFarland, 2019.
 Rentschler, Eric. The Ministry of Illusion: Nazi Cinema and Its Afterlife. Harvard University Press, 1996.

External links 
 

1935 films
Films of Nazi Germany
German comedy films
1935 comedy films
1930s German-language films
Films directed by Hans Steinhoff
Tobis Film films
1930s German films
German films based on plays
Films shot at Johannisthal Studios